The year 544 BC was a year of the pre-Julian Roman calendar. In the Roman Empire, it was known as year 210  Ab urbe condita. The denomination 544 BC for this year has been used since the early medieval period, when the Anno Domini calendar era became the prevalent method in Europe for naming years. 

Many Buddhist traditions believe it was the year when the Buddha reached parinirvana, though the actual year 0 of the Buddhist calendar corresponds to the previous year, 545 BC.

A mention to the Eastern culture is also inevitable at the times of 544 BC. King Bimbisar of Haraynka Dynastry annexed the territory Anga. Eventually Bimbisar also started the culture of matrimonial alliances.

Events
 People of Teos migrate to Abdera, Thrace to escape the yoke of Persia.
 Zhou jing wang becomes King of the Zhou Dynasty of China.

Births
 Sun Tzu, Chinese statesman and general (approximate date) (d. c. 496 BC)

Deaths

References